, there were about 19,000 electric vehicles in Minnesota, equivalent to about 0.25% of cars in the state. , about 3% of all new vehicle sales were electric.

Government policy
In 2021, Republicans in the state legislature proposed a bill that would tax electricity used to charge electric vehicles at public charging stations, in order to offset the lack of gasoline taxes collected from them.

, there were 37 electric vehicles and 116 plug-in hybrid vehicles in the state fleet.

Charging stations
, there were about 1,200 public charging stations in Minnesota. , there were 55 public DC charging stations.

The Infrastructure Investment and Jobs Act, signed into law in November 2021, allocates  for charging stations in Minnesota.

Economic impact
There have been concerns about negative economic impacts from EV-induced loss of demand for biofuels, which comprise a large portion of agriculture in Minnesota.

By region

Minneapolis–Saint Paul
, 2.7% of all new vehicles registered in the Minneapolis–Saint Paul metropolitan area were electric.

In February 2022, the cities of Minneapolis and Saint Paul launched Evie Carshare, the largest public electric vehicle car-sharing program in the United States.

Rochester
The first electric bus in the fleet of Rochester Public Transit was introduced in July 2022.

References

Road transportation in Minnesota
Minnesota